Britten Inlet is an ice-filled inlet and the only inlet on Monteverdi Peninsula indenting the southwest side of the Peninsula, south Alexander Island, Antarctica. The inlet was delineated from U.S. Landsat imagery of January 1973. In association with the names of composers grouped in this area, it was named by the UK Antarctic Place-Names Committee, 1977, after Benjamin Britten, the British composer.

See also

 Weber Inlet
 Haydn Inlet
 Verdi Inlet

References
 

Inlets of Alexander Island